Progress M-41 was a Russian unmanned Progress cargo spacecraft, which was launched in April 1999 to resupply the Mir space station and carry the Sputnik 99 satellite.

Launch
Progress M-41 launched on 2 April 1999 from the Baikonur Cosmodrome in Kazakhstan. It used a Soyuz-U rocket.

Docking
Progress M-41 docked with the aft port of the Kvant-1 module of Mir on 4 April 1999 at 12:46:50 UTC, and was undocked on 17 July 1999 at 11:24 UTC.

Decay
It remained in orbit until 17 July 1999, when it was deorbited. The mission ended at 19:51 UTC.

See also

 1999 in spaceflight
 List of Progress missions
 List of uncrewed spaceflights to Mir

References

Progress (spacecraft) missions
1999 in Kazakhstan
Spacecraft launched in 1999
Spacecraft which reentered in 1999
Spacecraft launched by Soyuz-U rockets